Recollection is the final album from the band Superchick. It was a CD/DVD release and it came out on November 29, 2013. The album features five new songs, six original versions and five remixes of past hits.

Track listing 
 "Mister DJ" 
 "Hope" 
 "Sunshine" 
 "5 Minutes at a Time" 
 "This Is the Time" 
 "Rock What You Got" [Fight Underdog Fight Mix]
 "Cross the Line" [Blockbuster Mix]
 "Hey Hey"
 "Stand in the Rain" [Symphonic Mix]
 "Beauty from Pain"
 "Pure"
 "We Live"
 "Hero" [Red Pill Mix]
 "Get Up" [Heelside Mix]
 "Barlow Girls"
 "One Girl Revolution"

References 

2013 albums
Superchick albums
Inpop Records albums